Norberto Anido (born 2 September 1933) is an Argentine footballer. He played in three matches for the Argentina national football team in 1959. He was also part of Argentina's squad for the 1959 South American Championship that took place in Ecuador.

References

External links
 

1933 births
Living people
Argentine footballers
Argentina international footballers
Place of birth missing (living people)
Association football defenders
Racing Club de Avellaneda footballers
Atlético Nacional footballers
Kimberley de Mar del Plata footballers
Argentine expatriate footballers
Expatriate footballers in Colombia
Argentine football managers
Racing Club de Avellaneda managers